Los Machucos, o Colláu Espina, is a mountain pass in the easternmost sector of the Cantabrian Mountains, known as the Pas Mountains, in Cantabria, Spain.

It is known for its slopes between 15-20%, reaching 28% at certain points. At the summit, there is a Monument to the Pasiega cattle.

In cycling, it was climbed for the first time in the 2017 Vuelta a España, when it was used as the finish of stage 17.  Los Machucos was also featured as a stage finish in the 2019 Vuelta a España.

References 

Mountain passes of Cantabria